|}

The Nassau Stakes is a Group 1 flat horse race in Great Britain open to fillies and mares aged three years or older. It is run at Goodwood over a distance of 1 mile, 1 furlong and 197 yards (1,991 metres), and it is scheduled to take place each year in late July or early August.

History
The title of the event acknowledges the friendship between the 5th Duke of Richmond, a former owner of Goodwood Racecourse, and the House of Orange-Nassau. The race was established in 1840, and it was originally restricted to three-year-old fillies. During the early part of its history it was contested over a distance of 1 mile. It was extended to 1½ miles in 1900, and shortened to its present length in 1911.

The Nassau Stakes was opened to fillies and mares aged four or older in 1975. For a period it was classed at Group 2 level, and it was promoted to Group 1 status in 1999.

The race is currently held on the third day of the five-day Glorious Goodwood meeting.

Records
Most successful horse (3 wins):
 Midday – 2009, 2010, 2011

Leading jockey (6 wins):
 Nat Flatman – Dil-bar (1842), Mania (1843), Clementina (1847), Clarissa (1849), Hirsuta (1852), Cantine (1859)
 Sir Gordon Richards – Solfatara (1933), Coppelia (1935), Barrowby Gem (1936), Goblet (1948), Jet Plane (1949), Sea Parrot (1951)

Leading trainer (8 wins):
 Sir Henry Cecil – Roussalka (1975, 1976), Connaught Bridge (1979), Nom de Plume (1987), Lyphard's Delta (1993), Midday (2009, 2010, 2011)

Leading owner (7 wins):
 Waldorf Astor, 2nd Viscount Astor – Winkipop (1910), First Spear (1914), Pompadour (1921), Concertina (1923), Saucy Sue (1925), Book Law (1927), Jet Plane (1949)

Winners since 1975

Earlier winners

 1840: Rosa Bianca
 1841: Scarf
 1842: Dil-bar
 1843: Mania
 1844: All Round My Hat
 1845: Refraction
 1846: Princess Alice
 1847: Clementina
 1848: Canezou
 1849: Clarissa
 1850: Nutmeg
 1851: Anspach
 1852: Hirsuta
 1853: Mayfair
 1854: Virago
 1855: Instructress
 1856: Mincepie
 1857: Beechnut
 1858: Go-ahead
 1859: Cantine
 1860: Provision
 1861: Pardalote
 1862: Bertha
 1863: Fantail
 1864: Bradamante
 1865: Peeress
 1866: Hebe
 1867: The Duchess
 1868: Leonie
 1869: Morna
 1870: Agility
 1871: Lady Atholstone
 1872: Maid of Perth
 1873: Albani
 1874: Aventuriere
 1875: Spinaway
 1876: Zee
 1877: Lady Golightly
 1878: Eau de Vie
 1879: Reconciliation
 1880: Muriel
 1881: Thebais
 1882: St Marguerite
 1883: Spectre
 1884: Sandiway
 1885: Armida
 1886: Miss Jummy
 1887: Maize
 1888: Zanzibar
 1889: Wrinkle
 1890: Memoir
 1891: Haute Saône
 1892: La Fleche
 1893: Harfleur II
 1894: Throstle
 1895: Butterfly
 1896: Miss Fraser
 1897: Perce Neige
 1898: Chinook
 1899: Saint Lundi
 1900: Merry Gal
 1901: Royal Summons
 1902: Sceptre
 1903: Red Lily
 1904: Pretty Polly
 1905: Cherry Lass
 1906: Glasconbury
 1907: Altitude
 1908: Siberia
 1909: Maid of the Mist
 1910: Winkipop
 1911: Hair Trigger II
 1912: Belleisle
 1913: Arda
 1914: First Spear
 1915–18: no race
 1919: Keysoe
 1920: Most Beautiful
 1921: Pompadour
 1922: Selene
 1923: Concertina
 1924: Straitlace
 1925: Saucy Sue
 1926: Foliation
 1927: Book Law
 1928: La Sologne
 1929: Nuwara Eliya
 1930: Quinine
 1931: Suze
 1932: Ada Dear
 1933: Solfatara
 1934: Zelina
 1935: Coppelia
 1936: Barrowby Gem
 1937: First Flight
 1938: Valedah
 1939: Olein
 1940–45: no race
 1946: Wayward Belle
 1947: Wild Child
 1948: Goblet
 1949: Jet Plane
 1950: Flying Slipper
 1951: Sea Parrot
 1952: Hortentia
 1953: Happy Laughter
 1954: Key
 1955: Reel In
 1956: Dilettante
 1957: Swallowswift
 1958: Darlene
 1959: Crystal Palace
 1960: Desert Beauty
 1961: Rachel
 1962: Nortia
 1963: Spree
 1964: Cracker
 1965: Aunt Edith
 1966: Haymaking
 1967: Fair Winter
 1968: Hill Shade
 1969: Lucyrowe
 1970: Pulchra
 1971: Catherine Wheel
 1972: Crespinall
 1973: Cheveley Princess
 1974: Mil's Bomb

See also
 Horse racing in Great Britain
 List of British flat horse races

References
 Racing Post:

 galopp-sieger.de – Nassau Stakes.
 ifhaonline.org – International Federation of Horseracing Authorities – Nassau Stakes (2019).
 pedigreequery.com – Nassau Stakes – Goodwood.
 

Flat races in Great Britain
Goodwood Racecourse
Middle distance horse races for fillies and mares
Recurring sporting events established in 1840
British Champions Series
1840 establishments in England